General elections were held in Kuwait on 21 February 1985. A total of 231 candidates contested the election, which saw pro-government candidates remain the largest bloc in Parliament. Voter turnout was 85.1%.

Results

References

Kuwait
Election
Elections in Kuwait
Non-partisan elections